Novodesyatkino is a rural locality (a village) in Kusekeyevsky Selsoviet, Birsky District, Bashkortostan, Russia. The population was 55 as of 2010. There is 1 street.

Geography 
Novodesyatkino is located 17 km southwest of Birsk (the district's administrative centre) by road. Penkovo is the nearest rural locality.

References 

Rural localities in Birsky District